Scott Odenbach is an American politician and attorney serving as a member of the South Dakota House of Representatives from the 31st district.

Career 
Odenbach served as assistant general counsel for the Florida Department of Education. He is the owner and managing broker at Liberty Tree Properties realty and manages his own law firm. He served as a member of the Spearfish School Board from 2017 to 2020.

Election history
2020: Odenbach was elected to the South Dakota House of Representatives with 8,104 votes along with Mary Fitzgerald, who received 6,920 votes and they defeated Brooke Abdallah who received 4,590 votes.

References 

Living people
South Dakota lawyers
Republican Party members of the South Dakota House of Representatives
People from Spearfish, South Dakota
South Dakota State University alumni
University of South Dakota School of Law alumni
Year of birth missing (living people)